

The Acharius Medal is awarded by the International Association for Lichenology (IAL) for lifetime achievement in lichenology. The organization resolved at its 1990 meeting that it would simultaneously honor professional achievement and commemorate Erik Acharius (recognized as the "Father of Lichenology") by presenting a medal in his name.

The first Acharius Medal was made in 1846 by the Royal Swedish Mint for the Royal Swedish Academy of Sciences, although the original purpose for that medal is not known. Because the Swedish Mint still had the dies for the original medal, the IAL arranged for new medals to be made. The first of the new medals were awarded in that same year (1992) at the association's congress in Båstad, Sweden.

The medal
The medal is silver, with Acharius' profile on one side and the recipient's name on the other.

Recipients 

Source:

2021:

 Per Magnus Jørgensen
 James D. Lawrey

2018:
 William Alfred Weber

2016:
 Thomas George Allan Green
 Josef Hafellner
 Bruce McCune

2014:
 Peter Crittenden
 Pier Luigi Nimis

2012:
 Ana Crespo
 Leif Tibell

2010:
 Brian J. Coppins
 Thomas Hawkes Nash

2008:
 David J. Galloway
 Hannes Hertel
 Rosmarie Honegger

2006:
 Mark R. D. Seaward

2004:
 John A. Elix
 Ludger Kappen
 Marie-Agnès Letrouit-Galinou

2003
 David C. Smith

2002:
 David L. Hawksworth

2000:
 Teuvo Ahti
 Georges Clauzade
 Nina Golubkova

1996:
 Vernon Ahmadjian
 Siegfried Huneck
 Christian Leuckert

1994:
 Irwin M. Brodo
 Margalith Galun
 Syo Kurokawa
 Elisabeth Tschermak-Woess

1992:
 Dharani Dhar Awasthi
 Chicita F. Culberson
 William L. Culberson
 Gunnar Degelius
 Aino Henssen
 Peter Wilfred James
 Hildur Krog
 Otto Ludwig Lange
 Josef Poelt
 Rolf Santesson
 John W. Thomson
 Hans Trass
 Antonin Vězda

See also

 List of biology awards

References

External links
List of Acharius Medal recipients

Biology awards
Lichenology
Lifetime achievement awards
Awards established in 1990
Awards of the Royal Swedish Academy of Sciences